Fuscin is an antibiotic with the molecular formula C15H16O5 which is produced by the fungus Oidiodendron fuscum and other Oidiodendron species and
the fungus Potebniamyces gallicola. Fuscin is an ADP transporter inhibitor.

References

Further reading 

 

Antibiotics
Tricyclic compounds
Delta-lactones
Dihydropyrans